The Men's team sprint event of the FIS Nordic World Ski Championships 2015 was held on 22 February 2015.

Results

Semifinals

Semifinal 1

Semifinal 2

Final
The final was held at 15:03.

References

Men's team sprint